Kadri Lehtla (born 3 May 1985 in Tallinn) is an Estonian biathlete. She gives her debut 2006 in the IBU Cup with a 36th Place in a sprint in Forni Avoltri. Her best result in the IBU Cup was a 4th place in Östersund in the beginning of the 2011/12 IBU Cup season. She had her debut in the 2008–09 Biathlon World Cup with a 97th place in an Individual in Östersund.

She competed at the 2010 and 2014 Winter Olympics.

Biathlon results
All results are sourced from the International Biathlon Union.

Olympic Games

References

External links
 Profile on IBU
 

1985 births
Living people
Sportspeople from Tallinn
Estonian female biathletes
Biathletes at the 2010 Winter Olympics
Biathletes at the 2014 Winter Olympics
Olympic biathletes of Estonia